Nationwide: Independence Day is a compilation album presented by Too Short.

Background
The compilation was released on May 19, 1998 through Jive Records and Too Short's own Short Records. Most of the album was produced by Quinton "Quint Black" Banks, though familiar names Jazze Pha and Lil Jon also contributed production for the album.

The two disc set contained original material recorded by established artists such as Redman and Casual, as well as songs performed by artists signed to Too Short's recently formed Short Records, such as Baby DC and Badwayz.

Nationwide fared much better than Too Short's previous compilation, 1995's Don't Try This at Home, peaking at 38 on the Billboard 200 and 7 on the Top R&B/Hip-Hop Albums. The album eventually sold over 500,000 copies and was certified gold by RIAA on July 28, 1998.

Track listing

Disc 1
"Short Dog/Hit 'Em Up" – 4:17 (Too Short)  
"Independence Day" – 4:15 (Too Short and Keith Murray)  
"Get Your Hustle On" – 4:30 (Baby DC and Too Short) 
"Spread Your Love" – 4:35 (Murda One) 
"Abstract Hustle" – 4:47 (38 Deep and Kat)
"When You See Me" – 3:57 (G Side)  
"All About It" – 7:38 (Pimp C and Too Short) 
"Time After Time" – 4:36 (Casual and Dollar Will) 
"Are You Ready for This" – 5:31 (Badwayz)  
"Lady Luv" – 5:42 (ZU) 
"Wreckognize" – 4:15 (Mddl Fngz)
"Paper Chase" – 4:16 (Al Block) 
"Playa Hatin' Hoes" – 4:07 (Playa Playa)

Disc 2
"Pimpin' Ain't Easy" – 4:30 (Polyester Players) 
"Couldn't Be a Better Player" – 6:06 (Lil Jon and Too Short)  
"Don't Stop" – 4:20 (Lyrical Giants)  
"Get All Your Change" – 4:23 (Trauma Black, Big Zack and Too Short) 
"Whateva Man" (Remix) – 4:03 (Redman)  
"I Ain't Gonna Forget This" – 4:39 (Badwayz and Jamal) 
"If I Wasn't High" – 5:55 (Studd)  
"Hellbound" – 4:12 (Slink Capone)
"Who Loves Ya" – 4:08 (Jayo Felony)
"Same Old Song" – 5:04 (Father Dom) 
"Keep It Real" – 4:02 (Too Short and Sylk-E. Fyne)  
"Killa Team" – 6:10 (Joe Riz and George Clinton)

Charts

References

1998 compilation albums
Gangsta rap compilation albums
Jive Records compilation albums
Record label compilation albums
Too Short compilation albums
West Coast hip hop compilation albums